Visa requirements for Fijian citizens are administrative entry restrictions by the authorities of other states placed on citizens of Fiji. As of 13 October 2020, Fijian citizens had visa-free or visa on arrival access to 88 countries and territories, ranking the Fijian passport 57th in terms of travel freedom according to the Henley Passport Index.

Visa requirements map

Visa requirements

Dependent, Disputed, or Restricted territories
 Unrecognized or partially recognized countries

 Dependent and autonomous territories

See also
Visa policy of Fiji
Fijian passport
Foreign relations of Fiji

References and Notes
References

Notes

Fijian
Foreign relations of Fiji